Dick Danello, stage name of Filippo D'Anello (Belvedere Marittimo, January 1, 1943), is an Italian singer, songwriter, producer, MC and actor who lives in Brazil. He was part of the 1960s Brazilian rock scene known as Jovem Guarda.

Biography

Filippo D'Anello was born in Belvedere Marittimo, city of Calabria, Italy. He started singing as a child in Convento dei Cappuccini just before immigrating to Brazil in 1955. He started his career as a professional singer in 1964, as Dick Danello, with the album "O Reino da Juventude" released by the popular São Paulo DJ Antonio Aguilar along with other acts like Sérgio Reis, The Vips, Marcos Roberto etc.

In 1965, he recorded an EP for Gravodisc, an independent label in Santos-SP, with the orchestra of Élcio Alvarez and the vocal group Eloá. Later in 65, he recorded a cover of Quando Vedrai La Mia Ragazza for Fermata Records, accompanied by The Jet Blacks and Os Titulares do Ritmo, which got to #10 in the charts.

Since then, he became a regular at Jovem Guarda a TV rock show compered by Roberto Carlos, who used to dub him "The italianissimo".

Still in 1965, Danello recorded Ogni Mattina, accompanied by The Jordans with arrangements by Pocho, a Uruguayan conductor who had his own combo; rights were bought by the BBC for broadcasting purposes in England.

In 1966, Danello covers Caterina Caselli's Nessuno mi può giudicare from the Festival di San Remo. In 1967, he covers Bisogna Saper Perdere originally performed by The Rokes and Lucio Dalla at San Remo. The single had arrangements by Edmundo Peruzzi backed with Il Mondo Non È Per Me, produced by Tony Campello. 

In the early 70s, Danello took part in movies and musicals as actor and singer. In 1971 he wrote the soundtrack and appeared as an actor with Renato Aragão and Dedé Santana, A Ilha dos Paqueras, with the Fauzi Mansur's direction. He also composed the soundtrack and starred in the first film of renowned Brazilian director Carlos Reichenbach, Corrida em Busca do Amor.

He also participated in the rock opera Jesus Christ Superstar of the Andrew Lloyd Webber and Tim Rice as an actor and singer, when the play comes to Brazil. The direction was made by the Russian playwright Eugenio Kusnet. Other actors in the play that have been revealed were Ney Latorraca, Eduardo Conde and Stênio Garcia. He composed soundtracks for over 30 movies and novelas, including the song Passion Love Theme, which was part of the novela Fogo Sobre Terra and was successful in the voice of several artists like Altemar Dutra, Moacyr Franco, Eduardo Assad, Joelma and many other singers. He also composed for the first film of Vera Fischer, Red Signal - As Fêmeas, with the band Magnetic Sounds.

Also in the 70s founded the Central Park Records, a record label which had great importance in the music production in the 70s, launching artists like Dave Maclean, Edward Cliff, Téo Azevedo, who was awarded the Latin Grammy in 2013, and many other regional and singers of the "False English" movement, that would mark the Brazilian music industry in the 70s. Dave Maclean sold over 1 million copies in Latin America and Edward Cliff conquered Europe with the hit Nights of September, composition of the Dick Danello, that becoming of the first places in Italy and playing in the English BBC.

In 1982 it began with the radio program Parlando D'Amore, who began to publish the popular Italian music in Brazilian territory. The program went through stations such as Radio Capital and Radio Gazeta, and winner of several prizes awarded by the municipal council of São Paulo as a recovery vehicle of foreign Italian culture and enriching the São Paulo culture as itself. The history of the program today is research topic of a group of academics of the social communication at USP. 

In the 1980s launches Parlando D'Amore and L'Italiano albums, recorded in Milan and Rome and distributed in Brazil. Begin to show in the Rede Manchete annual editions of the Sanremo Music Festival, launching in Brazil Eros Ramazzotti, Laura Pausini, Amedeo Minghi, Andrea Bocelli and other artists today devoted worldwide.

In the 1990s continues with radio program and is hired by the Italian company Costa Crociere, to elaborate cruises with Italian themes along the Brazilian and South America coast. He made the musical research for various projects of Rede Globo, including for Terra Nostra novela, one of the biggest recent successes of Brazilian TV.

In 2004 he released the Cuore Italiano album and, in the same year, is awarded by the Brazilian Academy of Art, Culture and History for his artistic contribution to the country. In 2009 he released the album Nelcuorenellanima, recorded in studios in Milan, Udine and Florence, bringing an original songs and a duet with Italian singer Edoardo de Angelis. In 2013 release Rock Italiano album, that makes a tribute to the roaring years of Italian music.

In 2014 receives the Order of the Musicians of Brazil an award in honor of his 50-year career and goes on tour with the band The Clevers to commemorate the anniversary of the Jovem Guarda, singing on the Costa Favolosa cruise, Homs Club and in the Virada Cultural of São Paulo.

Discography

Albums
1964 - O Reino da Juventude
1969 - Natal Feliz
1969 - As 14 Pr'a Frente vol. V
1969 - As 14 Pr'a Frente vol. VI
1970 - As 14 Pr'a Frente vol. VII
1975 - Nostalgia alla Italiana
1983 - Parlando d'amore 
1988 - L'italiano 
1990 - Parlando d'amore 
1993 - Tuttosanremo I 
1994 - Tuttosanremo II 
1999 - 20 successi italiani 
2004 - Cuore italiano 
2009 - Nelcuorenellanima' 
2014 - Rock italiano2015 - Temas da Boca do Lixo2015 - Italian Highway2016 - The Lost SessionsSoundtracks
1970 - A Ilha dos Paqueras1971 - Uma Verdadeira História de Amor1972 - Sinal Vermelho - as Fêmeas1972 - Corrida em Busca do Amor1973 - Os Ossos do Barão1974 - Gente que Transa1974 - Fogo sobre Terra1975 - Núpcias VermelhasEPs
1965 - Dick Danello1969 - 4 Sucessos Nacionais1969 - 4 Sucessos Internacionais 
1971 - Passion Love Theme 
1974 - Núpcias Vermelhas 
1974 - 4 pezzi di successo 
1975 - Angela's Love ThemeSingles
1965 - Quando vedrai la mia ragazza / Bussicabombaio1965 - Ogni mattina / Non aspetto nessuno1966 - Nessuno mi può giudicare / Parlami di te1967 - Bisogna saper perdere / Il mondo non è per me1968 - Poesia / Da bambino1969 - Zingara / Lontano dagli occhi1969 - Leylan / Já Não Existe Mais1970 - Chi non lavora non fa l'amore / La prima cosa bella 
1971 - Il cuore è uno zingaro / Poetica no. 12017 - Santo Natale2018 - Un Altro Giorno Senza Te Actor (partial filmography) 
1970 - A Ilha dos Paqueras1972 - Sinal Vermelho - as Fêmeas1972 - Corrida em Busca do Amor''

Awards 

1985 - Assembleia Legislativa de São Paulo
1986 - Premio Tanit (Spain)
2004 - Academia Brasileira de Arte, Cultura e História
2014 - Ordem dos Músicos do Brasil

References

External links 
 Official Website
 Jovem Guarda Page
 

1943 births
Italian-language singers
Jovem Guarda
People from the Province of Cosenza
Italian emigrants to Brazil
Living people